Pinhão is a municipality located in the Brazilian state of Sergipe. Pinhão has a population density of 42 inhabitants per square kilometer.

References

Populated places established in 1953
Municipalities in Sergipe